Kosumce  is a village in the administrative district of Gmina Karczew, within Otwock County, Masovian Voivodeship, in east-central Poland. As of 2007, the village had a population of approximately 280.

From 1975 to 1998 Kosumce was in Warsaw Voivodeship. Voivodeship Road 799 runs through the village.

Neighbouring villages include Dziecinów, Ostrówek and Piotrowice.

References

Kosumce